Judge Perry may refer to:

Belvin Perry (born 1949), chief judge of the Florida Ninth Judicial Circuit
Catherine D. Perry (born 1952), judge of the United States District Court for the Eastern District of Missouri
Joseph Sam Perry (1896–1984), judge of the United States District Court for the Northern District of Illinois
Matthew J. Perry (1921–2011), judge of the United States District Court for the District of South Carolina

See also
Edward Abbott Parry (1863–1943), British judge and dramatist
Justice Perry (disambiguation)